Let It Play  is the ninth studio album by Canadian musical artist David Usher.

Track listing
 "They Will Believe (In This Love)" with Alex Nevsky
 "We Will Be Free" with Monogrenade
 "Let It Play" with Dumas
 "No Cure" with Ingrid St-Pierre
 "Black Black Heart" with Marie-Mai
 "Dream of Flight" with 
 "War Again" with Karim Ouellet
 "Who Knows" from Daniel Lavoie's Qui Sait
 "Nothing to Lose" with  & Ingrid St-Pierre
 "Asleep Underwater" with Caracol
 "Till the Night Is Gone" with Monogrenade

References

External links
Let It Play official website

2016 albums
David Usher albums